En riktig jul ("A Real Christmas") was the 2007 "SVT Christmas calendar", broadcast by Sveriges Television (SVT).

The TV series was produced in January–March 2007. It was recorded at Ålstensgatan ("Ålsten Street") in Ålsten, Stockholm Municipality and at Årsta torg in Årsta, southern Stockholm. It was also recorded in studio until June.

It was directed by Simon Kaijser da Silva and written by Pernilla Oljelund and Hans Rosenfeldt.

Plot 
Mila is a 10-year-old girl who lives with her mother Katerina, who likes the neighbour Klas, but Mila doesn't like him and wants "En riktig jul" ("A Real Christmas") only with her and Katerina. She writes "En riktig jul" on a wish list to Father Christmas. Then the "tomtenissa" Elfrid comes for helping her.

Cast 
 Olivia Nystedt as Mila
 Vanna Rosenberg as Katerina, Mila's mother
 Allan Svensson as Father Christmas
 Suzanne Ernrup as Elfrid
 Kalle Westerdahl as Klas
 Dexter Dillén-Pardon as Jocke, Klas' son
 Johan Ulveson as Pascal Petersén
 Jessica Zandén as TV chief
 Viktor Källander as Einar
 Sissela Kyle as Ettan Nilsson
 Lennart Jähkel as Polar bear
 Emil Almén as Tekniknisse
 Anna Sahlin
 Shebly Niavarani as Frasse 
 Joakim Lindblad as Policeman

References

External links 
 
 En riktig jul on SVT's website

Sveriges Television's Christmas calendar
2007 Swedish television series debuts
2007 Swedish television series endings
Television shows filmed in Sweden